This is a list of snakes found in Kentucky.

See also
 List of snakes by common name
 List of snakes by scientific name
 Snakebite
 Epidemiology of snakebites
 List of fatal snake bites in the United States
 Snake handling in Christianity

References

Kentucky
Snakes